1935 was the 42nd season of County Championship cricket in England. England were beaten by South Africa who won the Test series 1–0 with four matches drawn. The championship was won by Yorkshire.

Honours
County Championship – Yorkshire
Minor Counties Championship – Middlesex II
Wisden – Jock Cameron, Errol Holmes, Bruce Mitchell, Denis Smith, Arthur Wellard

Test series

County Championship

Leading batsmen
Wally Hammond topped the averages with 2616 runs @ 49.35, a low average for the leading batsman.

Leading bowlers
Hedley Verity was the leading bowler with an average of 14.36 and 211 wickets.

References

Annual reviews
 Wisden Cricketers' Almanack 1936

External links
 CricketArchive – season summary

1935 in English cricket
English cricket seasons in the 20th century